San Pedro Ixtlahuaca  is a town and municipality in Oaxaca in south-western Mexico. It is part of the Centro District in the Valles Centrales region.

References

Municipalities of Oaxaca